Oued Rkel or Oued El Kell is a wadi located in Fès-Meknès, Morocco. It is a tributary of the Baht River.

References

Geography of Fès-Meknès
Rkel